Greensfork Township is one of eleven townships in Randolph County, Indiana. As of the 2010 census, its population was 1,082 and it contained 469 housing units.

History
Greensfork Township was organized in 1818. It was the site of the Greenville Settlement, one of three communities developed by free people of color who settled here by the mid-nineteenth century. Their children were among those who attended the Union Literary Institute, founded in the township by Quakers and free people of color after the state prohibited 'colored children' from attending public schools.

Geography

Unincorporated towns
 Arba at 
 Crete at 
 Spartanburg at 
(This list is based on USGS data and may include former settlements.)

References

External links
 Indiana Township Association
 United Township Association of Indiana

Townships in Randolph County, Indiana
Townships in Indiana